Three Fantasies after Friedrich Hölderlin is a 1982 collection of pieces for 16 voices by Hungarian composer György Ligeti. It was premiered in Stockholm on September 23, 1983, by the Swedish Radio Choir, under the baton of Eric Ericson, to whom it was dedicated. It was published by Schott Music.

Analysis 
The composition consists of three movements and a typical performance takes approximately 11 minutes. The movement list is as follows:

  (Halfway through Life). Lento
  (If from a Distance). Andante con tenerezza
  (Evening Reverie). Maestoso – Più mosso, agitato

The piece is a polyphonic four-part work for 16 voices (that is, four each of sopranos, altos, tenors, and basses). Its compositional style is strongly influenced by Ligeti's word-painting techniques from the 60s. Here, lyrics are almost indistinguishable, so the listener is encouraged to listen to the labyrinthic ramifications of the music instead of trying to understand the content of the original poems.

Ligeti commented on this work: "My three fantasies are emotional, 'onomatopoetic', overwrought, 16-voiced pieces (not micropolyphonic!)".

References

External links 

, Project Gutenberg

 Score provided by Schott through Sheet Music Plus

Compositions by György Ligeti
1982 compositions
Choral compositions
Musical settings of poems by Friedrich Hölderlin